The Bizarro League, also known as the Bizarro Justice League, are the Bizarro version of the Justice League.

Fictional team history

Bronze Age
Bizarro stole Lex Luthor's imperfect Duplicator Ray to create a world of Bizarros. Some of these insane clones formed a Bizarro-version of the Justice League. This team enforced their twisted version of justice.

The Bizarro World was destroyed in Crisis on Infinite Earths along with the Bizarro League.

Emperor Joker
When the Joker got 99% of Mister Mxyzptlk's power as part of the Emperor Joker storyline, he recreated the Bizarro League and the Bizarro World. When the imp got his powers back, he kept the new "Bizarro World".

Escape from Bizarro World
Bizarro gained "Bizarro Vision" (allowing him to make imperfect clones) under a blue sun. Bizarro planned to destroy the Bizarro World to be the reverse of Superman (because Superman would never destroy a planet). So the Bizarro-Lex Luthor led a revolt and unleashed the juggernaut Bizarro-Doomsday. The BL stopped the juggernaut by dropping a steel drum on him. However Bizarro ended up destroying the planet after all.

Members
 Bizarro-Superman - he is Superman's clone and the team leader and creator.
 Bizarro-Batman - he is the world's worst detective and Batman's counterpart.
 Bizarro-Green Lantern - he is the Bizarro-Hal Jordan and a cowardly Sinestro Corps member.
 Bizarro-Hawkgirl - she can fly like her counterpart, but her wings seem to be part of her.
 Bizarro-Aquaman - he cannot swim.
 Bizarro-Green Arrow - he sets up his arrows backwards.
 Bizarra-Wonder Woman - she has reverse powers of her counterpart Wonder Woman and was formerly called the Bizarro-Wonder Woman.
 Bizarro-Flash - he was made out of the "speed force" making him super fast and intangible.
 Bizarro-Hawkman
 Bizarro-Cyborg

Other versions
DC Super Friends: In issue #18, there was a Bizarro team called the "Bizarro Super Friends" based on the Bizarro League. Members were Bizarra, Bizarro, Bizarro-Flash, Batzarro, Bizarro Green Lantern (this version was the reverse of John Sewart), and Bizarro Aquaman. All of them, except Bizarro Green Lantern (the reverse of John Stewart), were based on the Silver Age versions of the characters. They are based in a mobile home in space.

In other media

Television
 In The Super Powers Team: Galactic Guardians episode "The Bizarro Super Powers Team", Bizarro creates an unofficial Bizarro team that is homage to the Bizarro League by making Bizarro look-a-likes of Wonder Woman, Flash, and Cyborg.

Film
 The Bizarro League appears in Lego DC Comics Super Heroes: Justice League vs. Bizarro League. Bizarro is brought to Bizarro World by Superman to keep him from causing trouble. When Darkseid invades the planet, Bizarro steals a duplicating ray from Lex Luthor and fires it at Batman, Wonder Woman, Green Lantern (Guy Gardner), and Cyborg, creating Batzarro, Bizarra, Greenzarro, and Cyzarro. Its properties were also shown to adversely affect Wonder Woman (who becomes powerless and constantly tripping up), Guy Garnder's power ring (limiting him to only make chickens), and Cyborg (who is falling apart).

Video games
 The Bizarro League appears in Lego Batman 3: Beyond Gotham. In the "Bizarro League" DLC, the Bizarro League had to protect Bizarro World from Darkseid's forces.

References

External links
 Bizarro League at DC Comics Wiki
 Bizarro League (Earth-One version) at DC Comics Wiki
 Bizarro League at Comic Vine

1983 comics debuts
DC Comics demons
DC Comics superhero teams